Kokborok is a Sino-Tibetan language of the Indian state of Tripura and neighbouring areas of Bangladesh. Its name comes from kok meaning "verbal" and borok meaning "people" or "human" and is one of the ancient languages of Northeast India.

History 
Kokborok was formerly known as Tripuri & Tipra kok, with its name being changed in the 20th century. The names also refer to the inhabitants of the former Twipra kingdom, as well as the ethnicity of its speakers.

Kókborok has been attested since at least the 1st century AD, when the historical record of Tripuri kings began to be written down. The script of Kókborok was called "Koloma". The Chronicle of the Tripuri kings were written in a book called the Rajratnakar. This book was originally written down in Kókborok using the Koloma script by Durlobendra Chontai.

Later, two Brahmins, Sukreswar and Vaneswar translated it into Sanskrit and then again translated the chronicle into Bengali in the 19th century. The chronicle of Tipra in Kókborok and Rajratnakar are no longer available. Kokborok was relegated to a common people's dialect during the rule of the Tripuri kings in the Kingdom of Tipra from the 19th century till the 20th century.

Kokborok was declared an official language of the state of Tripura, India by the state government in the year 1979. Consequently, the language has been taught in schools of Tripura from the primary level to the higher secondary stage since the 1980s. A certificate course in Kokborok started from 1994 at Tripura University and a post graduate diploma in Kokborok was started in 2001 by the Tripura University. Kokborok was introduced in the Bachelor of Arts (BA) degree in the colleges affiliated to the Tripura University from the year 2012, and a Master of Arts (MA) degree in Kokborok was started by Tripura University from the year 2015.

There is currently a demand for giving the language recognition as one of the recognized official languages of India as per the 8th schedule of the Constitution. The official form is the dialect spoken in Agartala, the state capital of Tripura.

Classification and related languages 
Kokborok is a Sino-Tibetan language of the Bodo–Garo branch.

It is related to the Bodo and Dimasa languages of neighboring Assam. The Garo language is also a related language spoken in the state of Meghalaya and neighboring Bangladesh.

Kókborok consists of several dialects spoken in Tripura. Ethnologue lists Usoi (Kau Brung), Riang (Kau Bru), and Khagrachari ("Trippera") as separate languages; Mukchak (Barbakpur), though not listed, is also distinct, and the language of many Tripuri clans has not been investigated. The greatest variety is within Khagrachari, though speakers of different Khagrachari varieties can "often" understand each other. Khagrachari literature is being produced in the Naitong and Dendak varieties.

Phonology 
Kókborok has the phonology of a typical Sino-Tibetan language.

Vowels 
Kokborok has six vowel (monophthong) phonemes: /i u e w o a/.

Early scholars of Kokborok decided to use the letter w as a symbol for a vowel that does not exist in English. In some localities, it is pronounced closer to [ɨ], and in others, it is pronounced closer to o.

It is also used for the diphthong  (spelled wi) after m and p

Consonants 

N' is the pronunciation of the nasal sound, e.g., in' (yes).

Ng is a digraph and is generally used in the last syllable of a word, e.g., aming (cat), holong (stone).

Ua is often used initially, e.g., uak (pig), uah (bamboo), uatwi (rain).

Uo is often used finally, e.g., thuo (sleeping), buo (beat).

Diphthongs 
A diphthong is a group of two vowels. The wi diphthong is spoken as ui after sounds of the letters m and p. Two examples are chumui (cloud) and thampui (mosquito). The ui diphthong is a variation of the wi diphthong. Other less frequent diphthongs, such as oi and ai, are called closing diphthongs. A closing diphthong refers to a syllable that does not end in a consonant.

Syllables 
Most words are formed by combining the root with an affix:
 kuchuk is formed from the root chuk (to be high), with the prefix, ku.
 phaidi (come) is formed from the root phai (to come), with the suffix di.

There are no Kókborok words beginning with ng. At the end of a syllable, any vowel except w can be found, along with a limited number of consonants: p, k, m, n, ng, r and l. Y is found only in closing diphthongs like ai and wi.

Clusters 
"Clusters" are a group of consonants at the beginning of a syllable, like phl, ph + l, in phlat phlat (very fast), or sl in kungsluk kungsluk (foolish man). Clusters are quite impossible at the end of a syllable. There are some "false clusters" such as phran (to dry) which is actually phw-ran. These are very common in echo words: phlat phlat, phre phre, prai prai, prom prom, etc.

Tone 
There are two tones in Kókborok: high tone and low tone. To mark the high tone, the letter h is written after the vowel with the high tone. These examples have low tone preceding high tone to show that tone changes the meaning:
 lai easy laih crossed
 bor senseless bohr to plant
 cha correct chah to eat
 nukhung family nukhuhng roof

Grammar 

There is a clear-cut difference between nouns and verbs. All true verbs are made with a verbal root followed by a number of suffixes, which are placed not randomly but according to definite rules.

Morphology 
Morphologically Kókborok words can be divided into five categories. They are the following.

(a) Original words: thang-go; phai-come; borok-nation; bororok-men kotor-big; kuchuk-high; kwrwi-not; etc.

(b) Compound words, that is, words made of more than one original words: nai-see; thok-tasty; naithok-beautiful; mwtai-God; nok-house; tongthar-religion; bwkha-heart; bwkhakotor-brave; etc.

(c) Words with suffixes: swrwng-learn; swrwngnai-learner; nukjak-seen; kaham-good; hamya- bad; etc.

(d) Naturalized loan words: gerogo-to roll; gwdna-neck; tebil- table; poitu-faith; etc.

(e) Loan words: kiching-friend; etc.

Numbers 
Counting in Kókborok is called lekhamung.

Common phrases

Dialects 
There are many Kokborok-speaking people in the Indian states. West Bengal, Tripura, Assam, Mizoram, and the neighboring provinces of Country Bangladesh, mainly in the Chittagong Hill Tracts. 

There are three main dialects of Tripuri, which are mutually intelligible, though the central dialect of the royal family, Debbarma (Puratan Tripur), is a prestige dialect understood by everyone. It is the standard for teaching and literature. It is taught as the medium of instruction up to class fifth and as subject up to graduate level. The other major dialects are Tripura, Jamatia, Reang (Bru), Kalai, Rupini, Murasing, Uchoi and Noatia.

Literature 

The first efforts of writing Kokborok were made by Radhamohan Thakur. He wrote the grammar of Kokborok named "Kókborokma" published in 1900, as well as two other books: "Tripur Kothamala" and "Tripur Bhasabidhan". Tripur Kothamala was the Kokborok-Bengali-English translation book published in 1906. The "Tripur Bhasabidhan" was published in 1907.

Daulot Ahmed was a contemporary of Radhamohan Thakur and was a pioneer of writing Kókborok Grammar jointly with Mohammad Omar. The Amar jantra, Comilla published his Kókborok grammar book "KOKBOKMA" in 1897.

On 27 December 1945 the "Tripura Janasiksha Samiti" came into being, and it established many schools in different areas of Tripura.

The first Kókborok magazine "Kwtal Kothoma" was edited and published in 1954 by Sudhanya Deb Barma, who was a founder of the Samiti. "Hachuk Khurio" (In the lap of Hills) by Sudhanya Deb Barma is the first modern Kókborok novel. It was published by the Kókborok Sahitya Sabha and Sanskriti Samsad in 1987. One major translation of the 20th century was the "Smai Kwtal", the New Testament of the Bible in Kókborok language, published in 1976 by the Bible Society of India.

The 21st century began for Kókborok literature with the monumental work, the Anglo-Kókborok-Bengali Dictionary compiled by Binoy Deb Barma and published in 2002 A.D. by the Kókborok tei Hukumu Mission. This is the 2nd edition of his previous groundbreaking dictionary published in 1996 and is a trilingual dictionary. Twiprani Laihbuma (The Rajmala – History of Tripura) translated by R. K. Debbarma and published in 2002 by KOHM.

The full Holy Bible in Kokborok language was finally published for the first time in the year 2013 by the Bible Society of India. The Baibel Kwthar is currently the largest work and biggest book published in the language with more than 1,300 pages and is now the benchmark for publications in the language.

The present trend of development of the Kokborok literary works show that Kokborok literature is moving forward slowly but steadily with its vivacity and distinctive originality to touch the rich literature of the rich languages.

Organisations 
Many Tripuri cultural organizations have been working fruitfully for the development of the language since the last century. A list of the present organisations and publication houses are:
 KSS, Kokborok Sahitya Sabha now Borok Kokrwbai Bosong or BKB in short.
 KOHM, Kokborok tei Hukumu Mission
 KbSS, Kokborok Sahitya Sangsad
 HKP, Hachukni Khorang Publishers
 JP, Jora Publication
 DKP, Dey Kokborok Publishers
 KA, Kokborok Academy
 KokTipra, the largest English-to-Kokbork online dictionary.

Government organisations 
Government research and publications organisations working in Kokborok development are:
 Directorate of Kokborok, Government of Tripura
 Tribal Research and Cultural Institute, Agartala
 Language Wing, Education department of the Tripura Tribal Areas Autonomous District Council (TTAADC)

Kokborok Tei Hukumu Mission (KOHM) 
'Kokborok Tei Hukumu' Mission is a Tripuri cultural organization which has been established to promote the language and culture of the Tripuri people. The mission was started by Naphurai Jamatia. It has its office in Krishnanagar in Agartala.

It is the largest publisher of books in Kokborok, most notable of which is the Kokborok Dictionaries by Binoy Debbarma, Anglo-Kokborok Dictionary (1996) and Anglo-Kokborok-Bengali Trilingual Dictionary (2002). Kok Dictionary, the online Kokborok Dictionary is largely based on it.

Kokborok Library, Khumulwng 
A library of Kokborok books has been functioning in Khumulwng town since 2015. It has been set up by the Tripura Tribal Areas Autonomous District Council (TTAADC) through Government funding and is functioning in a building constructed for the library in Khumulwng town near the Khumulwng stadium.

The library currently holds more than 5,000 books of Kokborok language and related topics.

Educational institutions
There are two universities in Tripura which provide Kokborok language courses as part of Bachelors, Masters and Doctorate degrees. There are more than 15 colleges in Tripura state where Kokborok is taught as part of the undergraduate courses. Also, there are more than 30 Government schools where Kokborok is taught in the higher secondary school level under the Tripura Board of Secondary Education.

Department of Kokborok, Tripura University 
The Department of Kokborok in Tripura University, Agartala is responsible for the teaching of Kokborok language and literature and started functioning in 2015.

It runs an M.A (Master of Arts) in Kokborok language, a one-year PG Diploma and a 6-month Certificate course.

The university grants Bachelor of Arts (B.A) degrees with Kokborok as an elective subject  in its various constituent colleges since 2012. The colleges affiliated to the university where Kokborok is taught in the B.A degree are:
 Ramthakur College, Agartala 
 Government Degree College, Khumulwng 
 NS Mahavidyalaya, Udaipur 
 Government Degree College, Dharmanagar 
 RS Mahavidyala, Kailasahar 
 Government Degree College, Kamalpur 
 Government Degree College, Teliamura 
 Government Degree College, Santirbazar 
 Government Degree College, Longtharai Valley
 SV Mahavidyalaya, Mohanpur
 MMD Government Degree College, Sabroom
 RT Mahavidyalaya, Bishalgarh
 Dasarath Deb Memorial College, Khowai

Department of Kokborok, Maharaja Bir Bikram (MBB) University 
The Department of Kokborok in Maharaja Bir Bikram University, Agartala is responsible for the teaching of Kokborok language and literature. This was made a State University in 2015.

MBB university has two affiliated colleges where Kokborok courses are available:
 BBM College, Agartala 
 MBB College, Agartala

Statistics

2011 Census of India 
The details as per the Census of India, 2011 regarding Tripuri language is given as follows:

TRIPURI 1,011,294
 Kokborok 917,900
 Reang 58,539
 Tripuri 33,138
 Others 1,717

2001 Census of India
Tripuri 854,023
 Kokborok 761,964
 Reang 76,450
 Tripuri 15,002
 Others 607

Script 

Kokborok had a script known as Koloma, developed in the 1st century CE and used by the Royal Family of Tripura. The Rajratnakar is believed to have originally been written in Koloma. This script fell out of use after the 14th century, and is widely considered to have been lost.

From the 19th century, the Kingdom of Twipra used the Bengali script to write in Kokborok, but since the independence of India and the merger with India, the Roman script is being promoted by non-governmental organizations. The Tripura Tribal Areas Autonomous District Council (TTAADC) government made regulations in 1992 and 2000 for adoption of the Roman script in the school education system in its areas.

The script issue is highly politicized, with the Left Front government advocating usage of the Asian Bengali script and all the regional indigenous parties and student organizations (INPT, IPFT, NCT, Twipra Students Federation, etc.) and ethnic nationalist organizations (Kokborok Sahitya Sabha, Kokborok tei Hukumu Mission, Movement for Kokborok etc.) advocating for the Roman script.

Both scripts are now used in the state in education as well as in literary and cultural circles.

Proposals have previously been made for the adoption of scripts other than the Bengali or Roman scripts, such as Ol Chiki. There have also been scripts created specifically for Kokborok in modern times.

See also
 Tripuri literature
 Kokborok drama
 Kokborok day
 Kokborok grammar
 Languages with official status in India
 Kokborok cinema

References

Further reading
 Pushpa Pai (Karapurkar). 1976. Kókborok Grammar. (CIIL Grammar series ; 3). Mysore: Central Institute of Indian Languages. 
 
 Jacquesson, François (2008). A Kokborok Grammar (Agartala dialect). Tripura Tribal Areas Autonomous District Council (TTAADC)
 Binoy Debbarma. 2002. Anglo-Kókborok-Bengali Dictionary. 2nd edition. Agartala: Kókborok Tei Hukumu Mission (KOHM).
 Article in KOHM Anniversary magazine 
 KOHM

External links
 Kok Dictionary: Online Kokborok Dictionary

 
Languages of Assam
Languages of Bangladesh
Languages of Mizoram
Languages of Myanmar
Languages of Tripura
Languages of West Bengal
Sal languages
Vulnerable languages
Tripuri culture